Jaco is the unofficial later title of a 1974 LP album on Paul Bley's Improvising Artists Label. It is notable for being the first professional recording showcasing the talents of Jaco Pastorius and Pat Metheny. The two had become friends in Miami the year before. Their collaboration continued on Metheny's debut Bright Size Life with Bob Moses, recorded in December 1975.

Track listing

Personnel
 Pat Metheny – guitar
 Jaco Pastorius – bass guitar
 Paul Bley – electric piano
 Bruce Ditmas – drums

References

Jaco Pastorius albums
Paul Bley albums
Pat Metheny live albums
1974 live albums
DIW Records live albums
Improvising Artists Records albums